Hunt's Hill may refer to:

 Hunt's Hill, California
 Hunt's Hill, Naphill